John Locke (February 19, 1792 – July 10, 1856) was an American naturalist, professor, photographer, and publisher. He was the first American to exhibit photographs to the public. Locke made a geological survey of Ohio in 1838 some of which was included in Ephraim George Squier and Edwin Hamilton Davis' Ancient Monuments of the Mississippi Valley (1848). He was elected as a member of the American Philosophical Society in 1844.

References

19th-century American inventors
1792 births
1856 deaths
American educators
People from Sullivan County, New Hampshire
19th-century American botanists
19th-century American photographers